
James Leslie Brierly (9 September 188120 December 1955) was an English scholar of international law.

James Leslie Brierly was born on 9 September 1881 in Huddersfield to Emily Sykes and Sydney Herbert Brierly.

Brierly taught at the University of Manchester from 1920 and at the University of Oxford from 1922 to 1947.

He died on 20 December 1955 at his home in Headington.

Publications 
 The Law of Nations (1928; 2d edition, 1936; 3d edition, 1942; 4th edition, 1949; 5th edition, 1955; 6th edition, 1963)
 The Outlook for International Law (1944) 
 The Covenant and the Charter (1947)

Citations

Works cited

Further reading

External Links
 

1881 births
1955 deaths
English legal scholars
People from Huddersfield